Charles Orr may refer to:

 Charles Prentiss Orr (1858–1922), United States Federal judge
 Charles Orr (rugby union) (1866–1935), Scottish rugby football player
 Sir Charles William James Orr (1870–1945), British colonial administrator, Governor of the Bahamas
 Charles Orr (socialist) (born 1906), American economist and socialist
 Charles Wilfred Orr (1893–1976), English composer
 Charles N. Orr (1877–1949), Minnesota politician
 Charles Orr (racing driver) (1956–2002), better known as Pete Orr, American racing driver

See also
 Charles Orr-Ewing (disambiguation)